Arcata High School is the primary public high school in Arcata, serving students in grades 9 through 12. It is located in Arcata, California and is part of the Northern Humboldt Union High School District.

History

Arcata High School was the first high school in Humboldt County, established in the late 19th century. In August 1894, an election was held involving the elementary school districts of Janes, Bayside, and Jacoby. The vote resulted in favor of founding a new high school. It was determined that the high school should be placed in Arcata, and named Arcata Union High School.

In 1903, in order to support the growth of the high school, a 6,000 dollar bond passed. This bond was used to construct the first school building on 16th and G streets, in Arcata. In 1912, enrollment reached 100 students. New buildings opened in 1920, 1924, and 1943. In 1944, enrollment had reached 500 students and 21 teachers were employed. In 1947, construction began on a new classroom wing and gymnasium. In 1952, the school's metal shop building, and science wing, began construction. In 1956, construction began on the wood shop building.

Academics
Arcata High School has an Advanced Placement program for those who wish to obtain college credit and take more advanced classes. Students at Arcata High School are also given the opportunity to earn college credit by taking classes at the nearby colleges, Humboldt State University and College of the Redwoods.

The high school contains on campus both a charter school, Six Rivers Charter High School, and a continuation school, Pacific Coast High.

Arts
Arcata High School has a number of special programs through the Arcata Arts Institute, which helps students with a particular interest in the arts (music, dance, drama, etc.) to pursue their interests. In addition to the Arcata Arts Institute, Arcata High School has a Concert Choir, Madrigal Choir, Jazz Band, and the ArMack Orchestra.

As part of the Northern Humboldt Union High School District, Arcata High School is closely affiliated with the only other public high school in the district, McKinleyville High School. Groups such as the orchestra and the jazz band, as well as some drama productions, combine students from both schools.

Athletics
Arcata High School is part of the Humboldt-Del Norte League of the CIF North Coast Section (NCS). As of 2022, the campus has compleated its updated athletic facilities featuring a Football Field, Track, and Baseball Field. There is also concessions, restrooms, storage, and ADA parking lot. It was built in what was commonly referred to as the "lower field" and has now been named the "James Washington Track and Field" after the Cross Country and Track and Field Coach.

Clubs 
Arcata High School has various student-managed clubs, which are supervised by the faculty. The school has a thriving maker culture, shown by the Maker Club, Girls Who Code, and Entrepreneurs' Club. Many clubs are dedicated to social change such as the Gay-Straight Alliance, Interact Club, The Girl Effect, Green Club, and Peace on Earth Movement. Arcata High School also has clubs relating to art, such as Art Club and Drama Club.

Arcata High School publishes its own newspaper written by the Pepper Box Club.

Notable alumni

Medal of Honor recipient James Allen Taylor graduated in 1954 or 1955 
Christa Johnson, LPGA professional golfer.
Geoffrey Owens, an actor best known as Elvin Tibideaux in The Cosby show
 Dane Iorg, former professional baseball player, primarily with the St. Louis Cardinals
 Garth Iorg, former professional baseball player for the Toronto Blue Jays
 Chris Butterfield, former Arena Football League player

Notes

External links
Official Website
Arcata Arts Institute

Educational institutions established in 1894
Educational institutions in the United States with year of establishment missing
High schools in Humboldt County, California
Arcata, California
Public high schools in California
1894 establishments in California